The Chinese Ring is a 1947 American film directed by William Beaudine.

The film is also known as Charlie Chan in the Chinese Ring (American poster title) and The Red Hornet.  This is the first to feature Roland Winters as Charlie Chan. It is a remake of the 1939 Monogram Pictures film Mr. Wong in Chinatown, with an identical story line and very little alterations of secondary characters.  Script writer W. Scott Darling reworked the plotline of Murder at Midnight (1931) for both later films.

Plot
Charlie Chan (Roland Winters) is a private investigator living in San Francisco. One day a Chinese princess comes to visit him in his home. She has just arrived from the East by boat. The princess manages to give Chan’s butler Birmingham Brown (Mantan Moreland) an artifact - an ancient heirloom ring - before she is shot and killed by a poisoned arrow through the window. She leaves a note behind, with the name ”Captain K”. Chan calls for the police to investigate this murder. Bill Davidson (Warren Douglas) with the SFPD comes to Chan, but his friend, the reporter Peggy Cartwright (Louise Currie), also arrives uninvited to the scene.
 
By examining the ring, it turns out the princess’ name was Mei Ling (Barbara Jean Wong). She arrived in San Francisco weeks earlier with two men, Captain Kong (Philip Ahn) and Captain Kelso (Thayer Roberts), to try and acquire fighter planes to fight off an enemy back home. For this purpose she had brought a substantial amount of money, $1,000,000, with her on the journey. A search for the money ensues, but it soon turns out there are more people looking for the lost money. Peggy helps out in the hunt, and she meets the princess’ maid, Lillie Mae (Chabing), and a deaf-mute boy living in the princess apartment. When Chan comes to talk to the maid, he finds her murdered in the apartment, and the deaf-mute boy manages to tell him that a man came to visit the apartment shortly before the maid was found dead.

Chan continues his search for the money, visiting the banker (who reads and writes in fluent Chinese) in charge of handling the princess’ assets abroad, Armstrong (Byron Foulger). While they are talking, Kong and Kelso, eager to get their share of the money, break in and kidnap both men and hold them for ransom. They are taken to the Chinese cargo vessel, but Birmingham manages to track them to the ship. Together with Chan’s son Tommy (Victor Sen Yung), they manage to free Chan and Armstrong, and when Bill and Peggy arrive to the ship with the police, Kong and Kelso are captured and arrested. Chan discovers that Armstrong is guilty of the princess’ murder, and of stealing her money. Armstrong also killed the maid to cover his tracks, and buried the little deaf-mute Chinese boy and buried him secretly in a pet cemetery plot to hide the crime.

Cast 
Roland Winters as Charlie Chan
Victor Sen Yung as Tommy Chan
Warren Douglas as Police Sgt. Bill Davidson
Mantan Moreland as Birmingham Brown
Louise Currie as Peggy Cartwright
Philip Ahn as Captain Kong
Byron Foulger as Armstrong
Lee Tung Foo Armstrong's butler 
Thayer Roberts as Captain James J. Kelso
Barbara Jean Wong as Princess Mei Ling
Chabing as Lillie Mae Wong
George Spaulding as Dr. Hickey

Controversies
The screenplay for The Chinese Ring was written by W. Scott Darling. The plot is nearly identical to Mr. Wong in Chinatown, the 1939 film starring Boris Karloff and released eight years earlier. That film was also an adaptation of Scott Darling's script for the 1931 film Murder at Midnight.

References

External links 

1947 films
Charlie Chan films
1940s comedy mystery films
1940s English-language films
American black-and-white films
Films directed by William Beaudine
Monogram Pictures films
1947 comedy films
Articles containing video clips
American comedy mystery films
1940s American films